Carbon is an unincorporated community in Kanawha County, West Virginia, United States, along Cabin Creek.

The community took its name from the Carbon Fuel Company.

References

Unincorporated communities in Kanawha County, West Virginia
Unincorporated communities in West Virginia
Coal towns in West Virginia